Navarino Island is a Chilean island located between Isla Grande de Tierra del Fuego, to the north, and Cape Horn, to the south. The island forms part of the Commune of Cabo de Hornos, the southernmost commune in Chile and in the world, belonging to Antártica Chilena Province in the XII Region of Magallanes and Chilean Antarctica. Its population is concentrated primarily in the communal capital, Puerto Williams, and in small settlements like Puerto Navarino, Río Guanaco and Puerto Toro. The island is a popular destination for fly-fishers.

History

History and archaeology may be the most valuable resource of Navarino Island and its adjacent sectors. It is considered to have one of the most dense concentrations of archeological sites in the world. The Yahgan were nomadic people, and moved their settlements on a seasonal basis. Their middens show their dependence of fish and shellfish for food, as well as some vegetables that they gathered.

There is a Megalithic Yaghan archaeological site dating to about 10,000 years ago near Wulaia Bay. Numerous remains of huts surrounded by ring middens have been found on the lowland terraces.<ref>C. Michael Hogan (2008) [http://www.megalithic.co.uk/article.php?sid=18795 Bahia Wulaia Dome Middens, The Megalithic Portal, ed. Andy Burnham]</ref>

Interest in the Yahgan culture attracts tourists. At the regional museum, the Martin Gusinde Anthropological Museum, exhibits of the Yaghan culture: their dwellings, fish traps, and crafts; and the remains of the 19th-century English missions can be seen. Aquatic birds, and the geology and botany of the island, also attract tourists.

The waters around Navarino Island were the location of the Snipe incident a military incident that took place between Chile and Argentina in 1958 as a result of a disputed border line in the Beagle Channel. The Snipe Incident was part of the wider Beagle Conflict between Chile and Argentina which brought both countries to the brink of war in 1978.

Both countries disagreed about the sovereign rights over the zone and Snipe, an uninhabitable islet between Picton Island and Navarino Island, claimed by both. Chileans call the waterway around the islet Beagle Channel, but in Argentina they called it Moat channel on the grounds that the Beagle Channel, allegedly, went south around Navarino Island.

 Etymology 
Jacques l'Hermite's fleet were the first Europeans to disembark at the Navarino Island, in 1624. They recorded the native name of the island as Wulla. HMS Beagle visited the island under the command of Phillip Parker King and Robert FitzRoy as part of a survey started in 1829. They named the island after then-recent Battle of Navarino (1827) which was a turning point of the Greek War of Independence against the Ottoman Empire.

 Features  
The coast of Navarino Island offers opportunities for sea kayaking among small barren islands and channels surrounded by native vegetation and populated by a rich variety of birds.

There is fishing in the Murray Channel. Boat trips can also be taken to visit the glaciers of the northwest arm of the Beagle Channel (located in the Alberto de Agostini National Park), and towards Cape Horn and Chilean Antarctica.

There is a hiking circuit around the jagged pinnacles known as the Dientes de Navarino.  The trail passes peaks known as Cerro Clem and Montes Lindenmayer, named in 2001 by the Chilean Ministry of Natural Resources for the author of the Lonely Planet guide. There are also areas for rock climbing.

Several ranches have been established on the island. The northern section of the island is suitable for horseback riding.

Salmon trout are found in abundance in Navarino Lake, and on the north coast of the island, the sea enters deep coves suitable for fishing snook.

 Climate 
The island has a polar tundra climate (Köppen: ET). Precipitation is distributed more or less uniformly across the year, and some falls as snow. In the extensive southernmost part of the island, including Lakes Navarino and Windhond, there is an increase in precipitation, a diminution of summer temperatures, and an increase in the winter temperatures through 

 Flora 

In the North end of the island the vegetation is characterized by the deciduous Magellanic forest, whose characteristic species are Lenga Beech (Nothofagus pumilio), with Ñirre Beech (Nothofagus antarctica) in the driest areas, Coihue of Magallanes (Nothofagus betuloides) in the wettest areas and some shrublands and Magellanic moorland in areas of poor drainage.

Immediately to the south is the evergreen Magellanic rainforest, probably associated with the increased precipitation, the greater altitude and an improvement in the drainage. The characteristic species is Nothofagus betuloides (Coihue of Magallanes), forming pure communities in sectors of greater altitude or coasts exposed to the wind.

The south portion of the island, surrounding Lakes Navarino and Windhond, and the territories of the southern coast, have a vegetation of Magellanic moorland.  This includes a series of vegetal communities, the Esfagnosa Tundra (Sphagnum magellanicum) and the Pulvinada Tundra (Donatia fascicularis - Astelia pumila'').

At higher altitudes, the terrain is Andean Desert, which lacks trees or tall shrubs and is less than 30% covered by vegetation.

Fauna 
Like much of surrounding Tierra del Fuego, Navarino Island has been severely affected by invasive beavers. The Canadian beavers were introduced to Tierra del Fuego in the 1940s by the Argentinian government in an effort to kickstart a fur trade in the area. With no natural predators, the beavers quickly spread to neighbouring islands.

Because the trees in Tierra del Fuego and Isla Navarino do not have any natural defences, they are unable to recover once felled by beavers.

Researchers from the University of North Texas, when studying Navarino Island found that the slow-moving water behind beaver dams has attracted two further invasive species to the Island, muskrat and mink. While the mink prey on the muskrats, they also feed on native geese and duck, leading to what they term an "invasive meltdown process".

Natural and cultural features 

Cultural historical sites are Bahia Wulaia and the English Mission of Douglas Creek. The large Stirling House, an iron prefab construction brought in 1869 from England by the Anglican English missionaries, used to be in Ushuaia. It was moved to Baia Tekenika, and then was installed for mission use at Douglas Creek. In the Yahgan cemetery at Baia Mejillones, tombs dating from the first half of the 20th century show elements of religious syncretism.

Villa Ukika is a district of Puerto Williams where the last few Yamana live.  Other settlements are the hamlets of Puerto Navarino - a fishing port for king crabs  - and Puerto Toro which claims to be the world's southernmost "settlement."

The area of Isla Navarino and the surrounding islands have been declared a UNESCO Biosphere Reserve in June 2005, called Cabo de Hornos Biosphere Reserve.

Access 
Puerto Williams can be reached by air from Punta Arenas, by DAP through the Guardiamarina Zañartu Airport, daily except Sundays. In addition there is a weekly ferry, crossing the Strait of Magellan and the Brecknock, Cockburn and Beagle Channels. The boat trip takes between 30 and 36 hours. As of January 2011, there was also a commercial connection by motorboat between Ushuaia and Isla Navarino.

Towns and villages 
 Río Guanaco
 Puerto Bevan
 Puerto Williams
 Puerto Navarino
 Caleta Eugenia
 Puerto Toro
 Villa Ukika

See also 
Cabo de Hornos (communa) (in Spanish)

References

External links 

 Translated entry from Chilean Official site
 Comuna de Cabo de Hornos / Commune of Cabo de Hornos official website
Museo Antropológico Martín Gusinde

 
Islands of Tierra del Fuego
Native American history